Kheyran Bareh (also Romanized as Kheyrān Bareh; also known as Kheylāv Berah) is a village in Boluran Rural District, Darb-e Gonbad District, Kuhdasht County, Lorestan Province, Iran. At the 2006 census, its population was 296, in 53 families.

References 

Towns and villages in Kuhdasht County